Umesh K. Mishra is a professor in the Electrical & Computer Engineering Department at the University of California, Santa Barbara (1990–Present).  He is the CTO, co-founder and board member of Transphorm, founded in 2007 and the first company to deliver gallium nitride (GaN) transistor products for high efficiency power conversion technologies.  Prior to Transphorm, he co-founded Nitres Inc. in 1996, which was the first company to develop GaN LEDs and transistors.

Career

Mishra earned a B.Tech degree from the Indian Institute of Technology Kanpur, India in 1979.  He went on earn his M.S. in Electrical Engineering at Lehigh University in 1981 and Ph.D. at Cornell University in 1984 and served as a principal staff engineer at General Electric.  Mishra was elected to the National Academy of Engineering in 2009 for his contributions to the development of gallium nitride electronics and other high-speed, high-power semiconductor electronic devices.  Mishra’s company Transphorm was selected by the World Economic Forum as a 2013 Technology Pioneer for its innovations in GaN technology, the solutions from which can cut total world electrical energy waste by up to 10 percent.

Mishra has over 1,000 publications and is a fellow of IEEE, member of the National Academy of Engineering, and a recipient of both the IEEE David Sarnoff Award and the ISCS Quantum Device Award.  Mishra ranks among the top 1% on the most highly cited researchers in the world and has an h-index of 100. He was elected to the National Academy of Inventors in 2015.

Awards and honors
Donald W. Whittier Chair in Electrical Engineering, UCSB 2013
Heinrich Welker Award for "The Development of GaN High Power Electronics from Conception, Education to Commercialization," International Symposium on Compound Semiconductors, 2012
Quantum Device Award, ISCS 2007
IEEE David Sarnoff Award, 2007
Distinguished Alumnus Award, IIT Kanpur, 2006
Young Scientist of the Year Award, International GaAs Symposium 1992
NSF, Presidential Young Investigator Award, 1989

References

External links

Cornell University alumni
1957 births
Living people